The Bălan is a left tributary of the river Râmnicul Sărat in Romania. It discharges into the Râmnicul Sărat near Bordeasca Veche.

References

Rivers of Romania
Rivers of Vrancea County